Wilfrid Lawson (ca. 1636after 1679) of Brayton Hall, Cumberland was an English politician who sat in the House of Commons in 1659 and 1660.

Lawson was the second son of Sir Wilfrid Lawson, 1st Baronet, of Isell and his wife Jane Musgrave, daughter of Sir Edward Musgrave, 1st Baronet  of Hayton Castle 

In 1659, Lawson was elected Member of Parliament for Cockermouth in the Third Protectorate Parliament.  In 1660, he was re-elected MP for Cockermouth in the Convention Parliament. In 1678 he was appointed High Sheriff of Cumberland

Lawson's father conferred the estate of Brayton on him, so founding the Brayton line of Lawsons upon whom the baronetcy later descended in 1743 on the death of Sir Mordaunt Lawson, 5th Baronet of Isell.

Lawson died before his father. He had married Sarah, daughter of William James of Washington, County Durham. They had two sons, Gilfrid and Alfred.

References

1636 births
English MPs 1659
English MPs 1660
High Sheriffs of Cumberland
People from Cockermouth
Younger sons of baronets
Year of death missing